The Rear-Admiral, Training Establishment Mediterranean was an command appointment of British Royal Navy established during World war II who supervised the training base HMS Canopus at Alexandria, Egypt He was subordinate to the Commander-in-Chief, Mediterranean Fleet.

History
The post of Rear-Admiral, Training Establishment Mediterranean was established on 18 May 1942, and was shore based. The post holder reported directly to the Commander-in-Chief Mediterranean Fleet until August 1942 when his post was abolished and the training establishment at Alexandria was closed.

Rear-Admiral, Training Establishment Mediterranean

Chief Staff Officer, Training Establishment Mediterranean

Secretary, Training Establishment Mediterranean

References

Sources
 Houterman, Jerome N..; Koppes, Jeroen (2004–2006). "Royal Navy, Mediterranean Fleet 1939-1945". www.unithistories.com. Houterman and Koppes.
 Warlow, Ben (20 March 2000). "6". Shore establishments of the Royal Navy : being a list of the static ships and establishments of the Royal Navy (2nd ed.). Cornwall, England: Maritime. .

T
Military units and formations established in 1942
Military units and formations disestablished in 1942